William Carson (24 September 1866 – 4 September 1955) was a New Zealand cricketer. He played four first-class matches for Otago between 1884 and 1888.

Carson was born at Dunedin in 1866 and educated at Otago Boys' High School. He worked as a marine engineer.

References

External links
 

1866 births
1955 deaths
New Zealand cricketers
Otago cricketers
Cricketers from Dunedin